{{DISPLAYTITLE:C9H11NO3}}
The molecular formula C9H11NO3 (molar mass: 181.18 g/mol, exact mass: 181.073893 u) may refer to:

 Adrenalone
 Styramate
 Tyrosine, or 4-hydroxyphenylalanine

Molecular formulas